Hengshui No. 2 High School is a senior high school in Hengshui, Hebei, China. As part of its gaokao preparation, the school has its students do English reading and physical exercise. A Sohu report says the physical exercise is like a ceremony.

See also
 Hengshui High School

References

External links
 Hengshui No. 2 High School 

High schools in Hebei
Hengshui